The following is a list of prominent people who were born in/lived in or around the U.S. state of New York, or for whom New York is a significant part of their identity.

Government and politics

Presidents

 Chester A. Arthur (1829–1886), 20th Vice President and 21st President of the United States – Schenectady
 Martin Van Buren (1782–1862), 8th Vice President and 8th President of the United States – Kinderhook
 Grover Cleveland (1837–1908), 22nd and 24th President of the United States – Fayetteville
 Millard Fillmore (1800–1874), 12th Vice President and 13th President of the United States – Moravia
 Theodore Roosevelt (1858–1919), 25th Vice President and 26th President of the United States – Manhattan
 Franklin D. Roosevelt (1883–1945), 32nd President of the United States – Hyde Park
 Donald Trump (born 1946), 45th President of the United States – Queens

Vice presidents

 Aaron Burr (1756–1836), 3rd Vice President of the United States – Manhattan
 George Clinton (1739–1812), 4th Vice President of the United States – Little Britain
 Schuyler Colfax (1823–1885), 17th Vice President of the United States – Manhattan
 Levi P. Morton (1824–1920), 22nd Vice President of the United States – Albany
 Nelson Rockefeller (1908–1979), 41st Vice President of the United States – Albany
 James S. Sherman (1855–1912), 27th Vice President of the United States – Utica
 Daniel D. Tompkins (1774–1825), 6th Vice President of the United States – Scarsdale
 William A. Wheeler (1819–1887), 19th Vice President of the United States – Malone

Governors

 DeWitt Clinton (1769–1828), 6th Governor of New York, built the Erie Canal
 Andrew Cuomo (born 1957), 56th Governor of New York, praised for his handling of the COVID-19 pandemic, but forced into resigning amid sexual harassment allegations
 Mario Cuomo (1932–2015), 52nd Governor of New York, father of Andrew Cuomo, praised public speaker and liberal icon
 Howard Dean (born 1948), former Governor of Vermont (1991–2003), and 2004 Democratic candidate for president
 Thomas E. Dewey (1902–1971), 47th Governor of New York, Republican nominee for president in 1944 and 1948
 Charles Evans Hughes (1862–1948), 36th Governor of New York, Secretary of State, 11th Chief Justice of the United States and 1916 Republican presidential nominee
 Kathy Hochul (born 1958), 57th (incumbent) Governor of New York, and first woman to hold that position
 John Jay (1745–1829), 1st Chief Justice of the United States, 2nd Governor of New York, and 8th President of the Continental Congress
 David Paterson (born 1954), 55th Governor of New York, first African American Governor & Lt. Governor of New York
 George Pataki (born 1945), 53rd Governor of New York, governor during the 9/11 attacks
 Horatio Seymour (1810–1886), 18th Governor of New York and 1868 Democratic presidential nominee
 Al Smith (1873–1944), 42nd Governor of New York and 1928 Democratic presidential candidate
 Samuel J. Tilden (1814–1886), 25th Governor of New York and 1876 Republican presidential candidate

Senators

 Barbara Boxer (born 1940), longtime United States Senator from California (1993–2017) – New York City
 Hillary Clinton (born 1947), former United States Secretary of State (2009–2013), New York Senator (2000–2009), and former First Lady (1993–2000); 2016 Democratic nominee for president – Chappaqua
 Roscoe Conkling (1829–1888), New York Senator (1867–1881) and leader of the Stalwart faction of the Republican Party – Albany
 Al Franken (born 1951), Minnesota Senator (2009–2018) – New York City
 Kirsten Gillibrand (born 1966), New York Senator since 2009 – Albany
 Bob Menendez (born 1954), New Jersey Senator since 2006 – New York City
 Chris Murphy (born 1973), former Congressman (2007–2013) and current Connecticut Senator since 2013 – White Plains
 Bernie Sanders (born 1941), Vermont Senator since 2007, former Mayor of Burlington, Vermont (1981–1989) and 2016 and 2020 Democratic presidential candidate – Brooklyn
 Chuck Schumer (born 1950), Democratic Leader of the United States Senate since 2017 and long-time New York Senator since 1999 cousin of comedian Amy Schumer – Brooklyn
 Robert F. Wagner (1877–1953), New York Senator (1927–1949) – Manhattan

Mayors

 Bill de Blasio (born 1961), 109th (incumbent) Mayor of New York City
 Michael Bloomberg (born 1942), 108th Mayor of New York City (2002–2013)
 Rudy Giuliani (born 1944), 107th Mayor of New York City (1994–2001), mayor during the 9/11 attacks
 David Dinkins (1927-2020), 106th Mayor of New York City (1990-1993), first African-American Mayor of New York City
 Ed Koch (1924–2013) 105th Mayor of New York City (1978–1989)
 Fiorello La Guardia (1882–1947), 99th Mayor of New York City (1934–1945)
 John Lindsay  (1921–2000), 103rd Mayor of New York City (1966–1973)
 Stephanus Van Cortlandt (1643–1700), 17th, and first native-born, mayor of New York City (1677–1678 and 1686–1688)
 Robert Anderson Van Wyck (1849–1918), 91st Mayor of New York City (1898–1901), first Mayor post-consolidation
 Robert F. Wagner Jr. (1910–1991), 102nd Mayor of New York City (1954–1965)
 Jimmy Walker (1881–1946), flamboyant 97th Mayor of New York City (1926–1932) forced into resigning by the Seabury Commission

Other politicians

 Parmenio Adams (1776–1832), sheriff and US Congressman
Alessandra Biaggi (born 1986), New York State Senator
Mario Biaggi (1917-2015), decorated policeman and US Congressmen
 Shirley Chisholm (1924–2005), US Congresswoman and 1972 Democratic presidential candidate
 John "J.J." Dewey (1822–1891), territorial legislator in Minnesota
 William H. Donaldson (born 1931), 27th Chairman of the U.S. Securities and Exchange Commission
 Geraldine Ferraro (1935–2011), US Congresswoman from NY and first female Vice Presidential candidate of a major political party in 1984
 Alexander Hamilton (1757–1804), 1st US Secretary of the Treasury
 Zach Iscol (born 1978), US Marine Corps veteran, entrepreneur, candidate in the 2021 New York City Comptroller election
 Boris Johnson (born 1964), Prime Minister of the United Kingdom
 Lazarus Joseph (1891–1966), NY State Senator and New York City Comptroller
 Jack Kemp (1935–2009), NFL football player for the Buffalo Bills, Secretary of Housing under President George H. W. Bush, and 1996 Republican nominee for vice president under Bob Dole
 Caroline Kennedy (born 1957), former U.S. Ambassador to Japan (2013–2017), and daughter of former president John F. Kennedy and former First Lady Jacqueline Kennedy Onassis
 William Loeb Jr. (1866–1937), secretary to President Theodore Roosevelt
Joseph McGoldrick (1901–1978), NYC Comptroller and NY State Residential Rent Control Commissioner, lawyer, and professor
 Harvey Milk (1930–1978), first openly gay person to be elected to public office in California
 Mazi Melesa Pilip, Ethiopian-born American politician
 William M. Tweed (1823–1878), known as "Boss" Tweed; Grand Sachem of Tammany Hall

First Ladies

 Barbara Bush (1925–2018), First Lady of the United States as the wife of George H. W. Bush
 Rose Cleveland (1846–1918), First Lady of the United States as the wife of Grover Cleveland
 Abigail Fillmore (1798–1853), First Lady of the United States as the wife of Millard Fillmore
 Mary Arthur McElroy (1841–1917), acting First Lady of the United States as the sister of Chester A. Arthur
 Elizabeth Monroe (1768–1830), First Lady of the United States as the wife of James Monroe
 Jacqueline Kennedy Onassis (1929–1994), First Lady of the United States as the wife of John F. Kennedy
 Frances Cleveland (1864–1947), First Lady of the United States as the wife of Grover Cleveland
 Nancy Reagan (1921–2016), First Lady of the United States as the wife of Ronald Reagan
 Eleanor Roosevelt (1884–1962), First Lady of the United States as the wife of Franklin D. Roosevelt
 Julia Gardiner Tyler (1820–1889), First Lady of the United States as the wife of John Tyler
 Priscilla Cooper Tyler (1816–1889), First Lady of the United States as the wife of John Tyler

Entertainment

Film, television, theater, and dance

 George Abbott (1887–1995), stage producer
 Eva Allen Alberti (1856-1938), dramatics teacher
 Gia Allemand (1983–2013), actress
 Woody Allen (born 1935), actor, director, and writer
 June Allyson (1917–2006), actress
 Tyler Alvarez (born 1997), actor
 Michael Angarano (born 1987), actor
 Diane Arbus (1923–1971), photographer
 Moisés Arias (born 1994), actor
 Alan Arkin (born 1934), actor
 Alison Arngrim (born 1962), actress and comedian
 Rosanna Arquette (born 1959), actress
 Jean Arthur (1900–1991), actress
 Jake T. Austin (born 1994), actor
 Awkwafina (born 1988), actress, rapper, and comedian
 Lauren Bacall (1924–2014), actress
 Morena Baccarin (born 1979), Brazilian-born actress
 Alec Baldwin (born 1958), actor, producer, and comedian
 Daniel Baldwin (born 1960), actor, director, and producer
 Stephen Baldwin (born 1966), actor, author, and producer
 William Baldwin (born 1963), actor, producer, and writer
 Lucille Ball (1911–1989), actress
 Anne Bancroft (1931–2005), actress
 Joseph Barbera (1911–2006), animator, producer, and director
 Mikhail Baryshnikov (born 1948), ballet dancer
 Frances Bavier (1902–1989), actor
 Barbara Bel Geddes (1922–2005), actress
 William Bendix (1906–1964), actor
 Constance Bennett (1904–1965), actress
 Matt Bennett (born 1991), actor
 Mabelle Biggart (1861-unknown), dramatic reader, preacher
 Yasmine Bleeth (born 1968), actress
 Corbin Bleu (born 1989), actor, model, singer-songwriter, dancer, and film producer
 Joan Blondell (1906–1979), actress
 Nikki Blonsky (born 1988), actress
 Ann Blyth (born 1928), actress
 Humphrey Bogart (1899–1957), actor
 Shirley Booth (1898–1992), actress
 Clara Bow (1905–1965), actress
 Abigail Breslin (born 1996), actress
 Spencer Breslin (born 1992), actor
 Richard Bright (1937–2006), actor
 Matthew Broderick (born 1962), actor
 Adrien Brody (born 1973), actor
 Mel Brooks (born 1926), actor, producer, and director
 Steve Buscemi (born 1957), actor, comedian, and director
 Edd Byrnes (1932–2020), actor
 James Caan (1940-2022), actor
 James Cagney (1899–1986), actor
 Jeanne Cagney (1919–1984), actress
 William Cagney (1905–1988), actor
 Néstor Carbonell (born 1967), actor and director
 Richard S. Castellano (1933–1988), actor
 David Castro (born 1996), actor
 Raquel Castro (born 1994), actress, singer, and songwriter
 Harrison Chad (born 1992), actor and voice actor
 Jeff Chandler (1918–1961), actor
 Chevy Chase (born 1943), actor and comedian
 Ruth Chatterton (1892–1961), actress
 James Coco (1930–1987), actor
 Claudette Colbert (1903–1996), actress
 Jennifer Connelly (born 1970), actress and model
 Elizabeth Marney Conner (1856-unknown), dramatic reader
 Kevin Conroy (born 1955), actor and voice actor
 Francis Ford Coppola (born 1939), film director, producer, and screenwriter
 Kevin Corrigan (born 1969), actor
 Billy Crudup (born 1968), actor
 Tom Cruise (born 1962), actor
 Jon Cryer (born 1965), actor, screenwriter, television director, and film producer
 Billy Crystal (born 1948), actor
 Kieran Culkin (born 1982), actor
 Macaulay Culkin (born 1980), actor, Kevin McAllister from Home Alone
 Rory Culkin (born 1989), actor
 Tony Curtis (1925–2010), actor
 Alexandra Daddario (born 1986), actress
 Matthew Daddario (born 1987), actor
 Claire Danes (born 1979), actress 
 Rodney Dangerfield (1921–2004), comedian and actor
 Marion Davies (1897–1961), actress
 Sammy Davis Jr. (1925–1990), actor and singer
 Agnes de Mille (1905–1993), dancer and choreographer
 Robert De Niro (born 1943), actor
 Willy DeVille (1950–2009), singer
 Don Diamont (born 1962), actor
 Guillermo Díaz (born 1975), Cuban-American actor
 Vin Diesel (born 1967), actor, producer, director, and screenwriter
 Ella Dietz (1847-1920), actress, poet 
 Taye Diggs (born 1971), actor
 Matt Dillon (born 1964), actor
 Troy Donahue (1936–2001), actor
 Kether Donohue (born 1985), actress and singer
 Kirk Douglas (1916–2020), actor and father of Michael Douglas
 Michael Douglas (born 1944), actor, producer, and son of Kirk Douglas
 Robert Downey Jr. (born 1965), actor
 Robert Downey Sr. (1936–2021), actor, filmmaker, and father of Robert Downey Jr.
 Fran Drescher (born 1957), actress
 Lena Dunham (born 1986), actress, filmmaker, and writer
 Jimmy Durante (1893–1980), entertainer, actor, singer, and comedian
 Jesse Eisenberg (born 1983), actor
 Omar Epps (born 1973), actor
 Peter Falk (1927–2011), actor
 Alice Faye (1915–1998), actress
 Jane Fonda (born 1937), actress
 Spencer Fox (born 1993), actor
 James Gandolfini (1961–2013), actor and producer
 John Garfield (1913–1952), actor
 Ben Gazzara (1930–2012), actor
 Sarah Michelle Gellar (born 1977), actress
 Richard Genelle (1961–2008), actor
 Mel Gibson (born 1956), American-born Australian/Irish actor and filmmaker
 Jackie Gleason (1916–1987), actor
 Paulette Goddard (1910–1990), actress
 Whoopi Goldberg (born 1955), actress, comedian, and co-host of ABC's The View
 Cuba Gooding Jr. (born 1968), Academy Award-winning actor
 Elliott Gould (born 1938), actor
 Jennifer Grey (born 1960), actress
 Jason Griffith (born 1980), voice actor
 A. R. Gurney (1930–2017), playwright
 Maggie Gyllenhaal (born 1977), actress
 Estelle Harris (1928-2022), actress, voice actress, and comedian
 Jonathan Harris (1914–2002), actor
 Hurd Hatfield (1917–1998), actor
 Anne Hathaway (born 1982), actress
 Susan Hayward (1917–1975), actress
 Rita Hayworth (1918–1987), actress
 Kathleen Herles (born 1990), voice actress
 Philip Seymour Hoffman (1967–2014), actor
 Judy Holliday (1921–1965), actress
 Whitney Houston (1963–2012), singer, actress, producer, and model
 Sarah Hyland (born 1990), actress
 Skai Jackson (born 2002), actress
 Rick Jason (1923–2000), actor
 Scarlett Johansson (born 1984), actress, model, and singer
 Jason Harris Katz (born 1969), voice actor and television host
 Danny Kaye (1911–1987), actor, singer
 Jack Kelly (1927–1992), actor
 Moira Kelly (born 1968), actress
 Morgana King (1930–2018), singer and actress
 Wayne Knight (born 1955), actor, voice artist, and comedian
 Ricki Lake (born 1968), actress, talk-show host
 Veronica Lake (1922–1973), actress
 Adam Lamberg (born 1984), actor
 Burt Lancaster (1913–1994), actor
 Michael Landon (1936–1991), actor
 Linda Larkin (born 1970), actress and voice actress
 Fredric Lebow (born 1956), screenwriter
 Peyton Elizabeth Lee (born 2004), actress
 Spike Lee (born 1957), director, producer
 Melissa Leo (born 1960), actress
 John Lithgow (born 1945), actor, comedian
 Aliana Lohan (born 1993), actress, singer and sister of actors Lindsay and Michael Lohan Jr.
 Lindsay Lohan (born 1986), actress, singer and sister of actors Ali and Michael Lohan Jr.
 Kristanna Loken (born 1979), actress
 Seth MacFarlane (born 1973), actor, writer, producer, and creator of Family Guy
 Steele MacKaye (1842–1894), playwright and actor
 John Marley (1907–1984), actor
 Vincent Martella (born 1992), actor
 John Martino (born 1937), actor
 Lee Marvin (1924–1987), actor
 James Maslow (born 1990), actor, singer, and dancer
 Alanna Masterson (born 1988), actress
 Christopher Masterson (born 1980), actor
 Danny Masterson (born 1976), actor
 Walter Matthau (1920–2000), actor
 Al Matthews (1942–2018), actor and singer
 Julianna Rose Mauriello (born 1991), actress and dancer
 Eaddy Mays, actress
 Jesse McCartney (born 1987), actor, singer, and songwriter
 Thomas McDonell (born 1986), actor
 Michael McKean (born 1947), comedian, actor and musician
 Caleb McLaughlin (born 2001), actor
 Ethel Merman (1908–1984), actor and singer
 Lea Michele (born 1986), actress and singer
 Arthur Miller (1915–2005), playwright
 Lenny Montana (1926–1992), actor and professional wrestler
 Robert Montgomery (1904–1981), actor
 Charlie Murphy (1959–2017), actor and comedian
 Chad Michael Murray (born 1981), actor
 Jack Nicholson (born 1937), actor and filmmaker
 Dylan O'Brien (born 1991), actor
 Cameron Ocasio (born 1999), actor
 Jerry O'Connell (born 1974), actor
 Eugene O'Neill (1888–1953), playwright
 Al Pacino (born 1940), actor
 Hayden Panettiere (born 1989), actress, model, singer, and activist
 Jansen Panettiere (born 1994), actor and voice actor
 Connor Paolo (born 1990), actor
 Corey Parker (born 1965), actor
 George A. Parkhurst (1841–1890), actor
 Josh Peck (born 1986), actor
 Amanda Peet (born 1972), actress and writer
 Nicola Peltz (born 1995), actress
 Will Peltz (born 1986), actor
 Anthony Perkins (1932–1992), actor
 Regis Philbin (1931–2020), actor, singer, and television personality
 Priscilla Presley (born 1945), actress and business magnate
 Fátima Ptacek (born 2000), actress and voice actress
 Bill Pullman (born 1953), actor
 Mae Questel (1908–1998), actress
 George Raft (1901–1980), actor
 Gene Anthony Ray (1962–2003), actor
 Nancy Reagan (1921–2016), actress and former First Lady of the United States
 Alan Reed (1907–1977), actor and voice artist
 Christopher Reeve (1952–2004), actor
 Tara Reid (born 1975), actress
 Leah Remini (born 1970), actress
 Alfonso Ribeiro (born 1971), actor, television director, dancer, and television personality; host of America's Funniest Home Videos and season 19 winner of Dancing with the Stars
 Thelma Ritter (1902–1969), actress
 Emma Roberts (born 1991), actress and singer
 Edward G. Robinson (1893–1973), actor
 Ray Romano (born 1957), actor, comedian
 Saoirse Ronan (born 1994), American-born Irish actress
 Mickey Rooney (1920–2014), actor
 Emmy Rossum (born 1986), actress, singer, and songwriter
 Mickey Rourke (born 1952), actor, screenwriter, and retired boxer
 Paul Rudd (born 1969), actor, comedian, writer, and producer
 Gianni Russo, actor, singer, and restaurateur
 Ernie Sabella (born 1949), actor and voice actor
 Zoe Saldana (born 1978), American-Dominican actress and dancer
 Ruben Santiago-Hudson (born 1956), actor and playwright
 Ben Schwartz (born 1981), actor, comedian, and writer
 Martin Scorsese (born 1942), director
 George Segal (1934–2021), actor
 Matthew Senreich (born 1974), screenwriter
 Charlie Sheen (born 1965), actor
 Talia Shire (née Coppola), actress
 Sylvia Sidney (1910–1999), actress
 Christian Slater (born 1969), actor
 Jamil Walker Smith (born 1982), actor
 Kevin Spacey (born 1959), actor, film director, producer, screenwriter, and singer
 Sylvester Stallone (born 1946), actor, screenwriter, producer, and director
 Barbara Stanwyck (1907–1990), actor
 Rod Steiger (1925–2002), actor
 Howard Stern (born 1954), actor, radio and television personality, author, and photographer
 Ben Stiller (born 1965), actor, comedian, and filmmaker
 Oliver Stone (born 1946), director
 Beatrice Straight (1914–2001), actress
 Lee Strasberg (1901–1982), Polish-born actor, director, and theatre practitioner
 Meryl Streep (born 1949) actress
 David Strickland (1969–1999), actor
 Kevin Sussman (born 1970), actor and comedian
 Veronica Taylor (born 1978), voice actress
 Benj Thall (born 1978), actor
 Leon Thomas III (born 1993), actor
 Gene Tierney (1920–1991), actress
 Ashley Tisdale (born 1985), actress, singer, and producer
 Michelle Trachtenberg (born 1985), actress
 Claire Trevor (1910–2000), actress
 John Turturro (born 1958), American-Italian actor, writer, and filmmaker
 Abe Vigoda (1921–2016), actor
 Denzel Washington (born 1954), Academy Award-winning actor
 Kerry Washington (born 1977), actress
 Michael Weatherly (born 1968), actor and director
 Scott Weinger (born 1975), actor, voice actor, writer, and producer
 Tuesday Weld (born 1943), actress
 Tom Welling (born 1977), actor, director, producer, and model
 Ming-Na Wen (born 1963), Macau-born actress and model
 Mae West (1893–1980), actor
 Kristen Wiig (born 1973), actress
 Olivia Wilde (born 1984), actress
 Tylen Jacob Williams (born 2001), actor
 Tyler James Williams (born 1992), actor
 Tyrel Jackson Williams (born 1997), actor
 Zelda Williams (born 1989), actress; daughter of late comedian and actor Robin Williams
 Lanford Wilson (1937–2011), playwright
 April Winchell (born 1960), actress
 Paul Winchell (1922–2005), actor and comedian
 Alex Wolff (born 1997), actor, musician, and composer
 Nick Zano (born 1978), actor
 Talia Ryder (born 2002), actress

Comedians, entertainers, and humorists

 Pamela Adlon (born 1966), actress, voice actress, producer, and director
 Carlos Alazraqui (born 1962), actor and comedian
 Woody Allen (born 1935), comedian, screenwriter, director, actor, author, playwright, and musician
 Desmond Amofah (1990-2019) YouTuber better known as Etika
 Alec Baldwin (born 1958), actor, comedian, and producer
 Lucille Ball (1911–1989), comedian, actress
Mike Bocchetti (born 1961), stand-up comedian and radio personality 
 Zach Braff (born 1975), actor, comedian, director, screenwriter, and producer
 Alyson Cambridge (born 1980), operatic soprano and classical music, jazz, and American popular song singer
 Michael Carbonaro (born 1982), actor and magician
 Eddie Carmel, born Oded Ha-Carmeili (1936–1972), Israeli-born entertainer with gigantism and acromegaly, popularly known as "The Jewish Giant"
 George Carlin (1937–2008), comedian and actor
 Michael Cole (born 1968), WWE announcer
Pete Davidson (born 1993), comedian and actor
 Philip DeFranco (born 1985), YouTuber and video blogger
 Danny DeVito (born 1944), comedian, actor, producer, and director
 John DiMaggio (born 1968), actor and comedian
 Jimmy Fallon (born 1974), comedian, actor, and television host
 Nika Futterman (born 1969), actress, voice actress, comedian, and singer
 Curly Howard (1903–1952), comedian, vaudevillian actor, and member of The Three Stooges
 Moe Howard (1897–1975), actor, comedian, and member of The Three Stooges
 Kevin James (born 1965), comedian, actor, screenwriter, and producer
Colin Jost (born 1982), comedian, actor and writer
 JWoww (real name Jennifer Farley) (born 1986), reality television personality
 Daniel Keem (born 1982) YouTuber better known as Keemstar
 Tom Kenny (born 1962), actor, comedian, voice of SpongeBob SquarePants
 Jimmy Kimmel (born 1967), comedian, producer, voice actor, musician, and television personality
 Jay Leno (born 1950), comedian, former host of The Tonight Show (1992–2014)
 Demetri Martin (born 1973), comedian
 Chico Marx (1887–1961), vaudeville comedian with the Marx Brothers
 Groucho Marx (1890–1977), vaudeville comedian with the Marx Brothers
 Gummo Marx (1892–1977), vaudeville comedian with the Marx Brothers
 Harpo Marx (1888–1964), vaudeville comedian with the Marx Brothers
 Zeppo Marx (1901–1979), vaudeville comedian with the Marx Brothers
 Jackie Mason (1928–2021), comedian and actor
 Kate McKinnon (born 1984), comedienne, actress, and voice actress
 Eddie Murphy (born 1961), comedian, actor, writer, singer, producer, and voice actor
 Rosie O'Donnell (born 1962), comedian, actress, and television personality
 Jordan Peele (born 1979), comedian, actor, film director, and screenwriter
 Melissa Rauch (born 1980), comedian and actress
 Kevin Michael Richardson (born 1964), actor and voice actor
 Adam Richman (born 1974), television personality
 Don Rickles (1926–2017), comedian
 Joan Rivers (1933–2014), actress and comedian
 Chris Rock (born 1965), comedian and actor
 Adam Sandler (born 1966), comedian, actor, screenwriter, film producer, and musician
 Adam Savage (born 1967), co-host of MythBusters
 Amy Schumer (born 1981), stand-up comedian and actress
 Jerry Seinfeld (born 1954), comedian and actor
 Judy Sheindlin (born 1942), lawyer and television personality (Judge Judy)
 Rowena Granice Steele (1824-1901), performer, writer
 Martha Stewart (born 1941), businesswoman, writer, chef, and television personality
 Jon Stewart (born 1962), comedian, actor, writer, producer, director, media critic, and television personality; former host of The Daily Show (1999–2015)
 Fred Tatasciore (born 1967), voice actor
 John Valby (born 1944), comedian and musician

Singers and instrumentalists

 Aaliyah (1979–2001), singer, actress, model, and dancer
 Christina Aguilera (born 1980), singer, songwriter, and actress
 Vinnie Amico, drummer
 Fiona Apple (born 1977), singer
 Harold Arlen (1905–1986), composer
 Ashanti (born 1980), singer 
 Adrienne Bailon (born 1983), singer
 David Baker, singer
 Chris Barnes (born 1967), musician
 Count Basie (1904–1984), jazz musician
 Bryan Bautista (born 1992), Dominican-American pop singer and contestant on NBC's The Voice season 10
 Jay Beckenstein (born 1951), saxophonist
 Madison Beer (born 1999), singer 
 Pat Benatar (born 1953), singer
 Tony Bennett (born 1926), jazz singer
 Mary J. Blige (born 1971), singer, songwriter, and actress
 Jon Bon Jovi (born 1962), singer-songwriter, record producer, philanthropist, and actor (Bon Jovi)
 Laura Branigan (1952–2004), singer
 Keith Buckley (born 1979), musician
 Clem Burke (born 1955), musician and drummer (Blondie)
 Maria Callas (1923–1977), opera singer
 Mariah Carey (born 1969), pop and R&B singer, and songwriter
 Vanessa Carlton (born 1980), pop singer-songwriter
 Peter Case (born 1954), singer-songwriter
 Peter Cincotti (born 1983), singer, songwriter, and pianist
 Coko (born 1973), singer (SWV)
 John Coltrane (1926–1967), jazz musician
 Aaron Copland (1900–1990), composer
 Warren Cuccurullo (born 1956), rock guitarist
 Vic Dana (born 1942), singer
 Dawin (full name Dawin Polanco; born 1990), hip hop-R&B singer/songwriter and record producer
 Blossom Dearie (1924–2009), jazz singer and pianist
 Lana Del Rey (born 1985), singer and songwriter
 Rob Derhak (born 1968), bass guitarist
 Lance Diamond (1945–2015), singer
 Neil Diamond (born 1941), singer and songwriter
 Ani DiFranco (born 1970), singer-songwriter
 Jonathan Donahue (born 1966), rock musician
 JoAnn Falletta (born 1954), classical guitarist and orchestral conductor
 Morton Feldman (1926–1987), composer
 Ella Fitzgerald (1918–1996), singer
 John Flansburgh (born 1960), singer-songwriter
 Brendan Fletcher (born 1990), pop singer-songwriter and contestant on NBC's The Voice season 11
 Lukas Foss (1922–2009), composer and orchestral conductor
 Sawyer Fredericks (born 1999), contemporary folk singer-songwriter, and winner of NBC's The Voice season 8
 Dave Fridmann, producer
 Lady Gaga (real name Stefani Germanotta) (born 1986), singer and songwriter
 Art Garfunkel (born 1941), folk rock singer, poet, and actor (Simon & Garfunkel)
 Chuck Garvey, guitarist
 George Gershwin (1898–1937), composer
 Kim Gordon (born 1953), bass guitarist, guitarist, singer, songwriter, and visual artist (Sonic Youth)
 Lesley Gore (1946–2015), singer-songwriter, actress, and activist
 Andy Grammer (born 1983), singer-songwriter and record producer
 Grasshopper (born Sean Mackowiak; born 1967), rock musician
 Jim Hall (1930–2013), jazz guitarist
 Debbie Harry (born 1945), singer-songwriter, actress, and lead singer of Blondie
 Alan Heatherington (born 1945), orchestral conductor
 Ray Henderson (1897–1970), songwriter
 Lauryn Hill (born 1975), singer-songwriter, rapper, record producer, and actress
 Joel Hirschhorn (1938–2005), songwriter
 Billie Holiday (1915–1959), jazz and blues singer
 Bob Holz (born 1958), drummer and composer
 Lena Horne (1917–2010), singer and actress
 Whitney Houston (1963–2012), singer, actress, producer, and model
 Freddie Jackson (born 1956), singer
 Rick James (1948–2004), singer
 Billy Joel (born 1949), pianist, singer, and songwriter
 Joe Jonas (born 1989), singer-songwriter, actor, former member of the Jonas Brothers, brother of Nick, and current lead singer of DNCE
 Nick Jonas (born 1992), singer-songwriter, producer, actor, brother of Joe, and former member of the Jonas Brothers
 Jerome Kern (1885–1945), composer
 Alicia Keys (born 1981), singer-songwriter
 Carole King (born 1942), singer-songwriter
 Linda Király (born 1983), American-born Hungarian pop singer-songwriter and sister of Viktor
 Viktor Király (born 1984), American-born Hungarian pop singer and contestant on NBC's The Voice season 9
 Cyndi Lauper (born 1953), singer
 Jacquie Lee (born 1997), pop singer and contestant on NBC's The Voice season 5
 Mel Lewis (1929–1990), drummer
 John Linnell (born 1959), singer-songwriter
 Joe Locke (born 1959), jazz artist
 John Lombardo (born 1952), musician and songwriter
 Jennifer Lopez (born 1969), singer, actress, and dancer
 David Lucas (born 1937), composer
 Gary Mallaber (born 1946), drummer
 Barry Manilow (born 1943), singer-songwriter and musician
 Constantine Maroulis (born 1975), singer
 Melanie Martinez (born 1995), singer, songwriter, and music/video director
 Brian McKnight (born 1969), R&B singer
 Don McLean (born 1945), singer
 Don Menza (born 1936), saxophonist
 Idina Menzel (born 1971), singer-songwriter, actress, and voice of Elsa in Frozen
 Natalie Merchant (born 1963), singer-songwriter
 Stephanie Mills (born 1957), singer
 Janelle Monáe (born 1985), musician, model, and actress
 Gurf Morlix, musician
 Hani Naser (1950–2020), Jordanian-American musician
 Josh Newton (born 1973), bassist
 Willie Nile (born 1948), singer-songwriter
 Laura Nyro (1947–1997), singer-songwriter
 Colby O'Donis (born 1989), pop-R&B singer-songwriter, guitarist, producer, and actor
 Olivia (born 1981), R&B singer known for contributing vocals to the 50 Cent song "Candy Shop"
 Jack Owen (born 1967), guitarist (Cannibal Corpse)
 Tina Parol (born 1988), singer-songwriter
 Caroline Pennell (born 1996), singer-songwriter and contestant on NBC's The Voice season 5
 Alisan Porter (born 1981), retired actress, singer-songwriter, and winner of NBC's The Voice season 10
 Charlie Puth (born 1991), pop singer-songwriter and record producer
 Joey Ramone (1951–2001), Punk rock singer-songwriter and musician (Ramones)
 Mary Ramsey (born 1963), musician
 Sharon Redd (1945–1992), singer
 Lou Reed (1942–2013), singer, songwriter, and guitarist
 Bebe Rexha (born 1989), singer and songwriter 
 Neil Rosenshein (born 1947), operatic singer and lyric tenor
 Rahzel (born 1964), beatboxer
 Kevin Rudolf (born 1983), pop/indie rock singer, musician, and record producer
 Jason Sebastian Russo (born 1973), rock musician
 Justin Russo (born 1976), rock musician
 John Rzeznik (born 1965), musician (Goo Goo Dolls)
 Adam Schlesinger (1967–2020), musician (Fountains of Wayne), songwriter, producer, and arranger
 Al Schnier (born 1968), guitarist
 John Serry Sr. (1915–2003), concert accordionist, organist, composer, arranger, and educator
 Billy Sheehan (born 1953), bass guitarist
 Kevin Shields (born 1963), musician, singer-songwriter and record producer (My Bloody Valentine)
 Paul Simon (born 1941), folk rock musician, guitarist, singer-songwriter, and actor (Simon & Garfunkel)
 Frank Sinatra (1915–1998), iconic jazz/pop singer, actor, and producer
 Lonnie Smith (1942–2021), jazz organist
 Ronnie Spector (born 1943), singer (The Ronettes)
 John Stevens (born 1987), singer
 Stevie J (born Steve Jordan), musician
 Barbra Streisand (born 1942), singer, actress
 Stan Szelest (1943–1991), musician
 Robby Takac (born 1964), musician (Goo Goo Dolls)
 George Tutuska, musician (Goo Goo Dolls, Jackdaw)
 Steven Tyler (born 1948), Hard rock musician, singer-songwriter, multi-instrumentalist, former television music competition judge, and lead singer of the rock band Aerosmith
 Sal Valentinetti (born 1995), Italian-American jazz singer and contestant on America's Got Talent season 11
 Grace VanderWaal (born 2004), singer-songwriter, ukuleleist, and winner of America's Got Talent season 11
 Luther Vandross (1951–2005), singer
 Jeremy Wall, jazz musician
 Luke Walter Jr. (1947–1996), Belgian musician
 Grover Washington Jr. (1943–1999), saxophonist
 Gerard Way (born 1977), pop punk-alternative/punk/emo rock musician, singer-songwriter, comic book writer, actor, and former lead singer of My Chemical Romance
 Alex Webster (born 1969), bassist (Cannibal Corpse)
 Mary Weiss (born 1948), singer (The Shangri-Las)
 Cory Wells (1941–2015), singer
 Patrick Wilson (born 1969), drummer
 Jack Yellen (1892–1991), lyricist, composer

Rappers

 2Pac (1971–1996), rapper, record producer, actor, and poet
 50 Cent (born 1975), rapper, actor, businessman, and actor
 ASAP Rocky (born 1988), rapper, record producer, director, actor, and model
 Cardi B (born 1992), rapper
 Moses Michael Levi Barrow (born Jamal Michael Barrow; 1978), better known by his stage name Shyne, Belizean rapper and politician
 Beastie Boys (1979–2014), hip hop/hardcore punk band
 Big L (1974–1999), hip-hop recording artist
 Action Bronson (born 1983), rapper and television presenter
 Foxy Brown (born 1978), rapper
 Busta Rhymes (born 1972), hip hop recording artist, actor, record producer, and record executive
 Cam'ron (born 1976), rapper, actor, and entrepreneur
 Sean Combs (born 1969), rapper, singer, songwriter, actor, record producer, and entrepreneur (also known as "P. Diddy", "Puff Daddy", or "Diddy")
 Desiigner (born 1997), rapper, singer, songwriter, record producer, record executive, and actor
 DMX (1970–2021), rapper, record producer, and actor
 Fabolous (born 1977), rapper
 Ice Spice (born 2000), rapper
 Jadakiss (born 1975), rapper
 Jay-Z (born 1969), rapper, businessman, investor, and actor
 Fat Joe (born 1970), rapper
 Jim Jones (1931–1978), hip-hop recording artist
 MC Jin, rapper and actor
 KRS-One (born 1965), rapper and occasional producer
 Lil' Kim (born 1975), rapper, songwriter, record producer, model, and actress
 LL Cool J (born 1968), rapper, actor, and host of Spike TV's Lip Sync Battle
 The Lox
 Biz Markie (1964-2021), rapper, DJ, and record producer
 Matisyahu (1979), rapper, reggae vocalist, beatboxer, and alternative rock musician
 MF Doom (born 1971), rapper and record producer
 Mobb Deep
 Mos Def (born 1973), hip hop recording artist, actor, and activist
 Remy Ma (born 1980), rapper
 Post Malone (born 1995), rapper, singer, songwriter, and record producer
 Nicki Minaj (born 1982), rapper, singer, songwriter, and actress 
 Nas (born 1973), hip hop recording artist, record producer, actor, and entrepreneur
 The Notorious B.I.G. (1972–1997), rapper and actor (also known as "Biggie Smalls" or "Biggie")
 Onyx
 Rakim (born 1968), rapper
 Remedy (born Ross Filler in 1972), rapper
 Ja Rule (born 1976), rapper
 Run-DMC
 Russ (born 1992), rapper, singer, songwriter, and record producer
 Juelz Santana (born 1982), rapper and actor
 Bobby Shmurda (born 1994), rapper
 Freaky Tah (1971–1999), rapper
 Pop Smoke (1999-2020), rapper
 A Tribe Called Quest
 Sheck Wes (born 1998), rapper
 Wu-Tang Clan
 Adam Yauch (1964–2012), rapper, singer, musician, songwriter, director, and film distributor
 6ix9ine (born 1996), rapper, songwriter
 Joey Badass (born 1995), rapper
 Eli Da Vincii, rapper, songwriter

Bands

 AJR (2005–), indie pop band
 American Authors (2006–), pop rock band
 Aventura, bachata group
 Beastie Boys (1979–2014), hip hop/hardcore punk band
 Blondie (1974–), new wave-punk rock band
 Cobra Starship (2006–2015), dance-pop band
 Blue Öyster Cult (1967–), rock band
 Goo Goo Dolls (1985–), alternative-pop rock band
 KIϟϟ (1973–), hard rock band
 Naturally 7, a cappella band
 Ramones (1974–1996), punk rock band
 Steely Dan (1971–), jazz rock band
 Twisted Sister (1972–), heavy metal band
 X Ambassadors (2009–), alternative/pop rock band

Art, literature, journalism, and philosophy

 Lois Bryan Adams (1817-18170), writer, newspaper editor/proprietor
 Samuel Hopkins Adams (1871–1958), muckraker; born in Dunkirk
 Scott Adams (born 1957), cartoonist and creator of Dilbert
 George Worsley Adamson (1913–2005), illustrator and cartoonist
 Nancy H. Adsit (1825-1902), art educator
 Marv Albert (born 1941), basketball announcer on TNT
 Esther Saville Allen (1837-1913), author
 Lavilla Esther Allen (1834-1903), writer, poet, reader 
 Estelle Mendell Amory (1845-1923), author
 Susan B. Anthony (1820–1906), women's rights activist
 Cory Arcangel (born 1978), artist
 Emma Whitcomb Babcock (1849-1926), litterateur, author
 William Bliss Baker (1859–1886), landscape painter
 Mary E. C. Bancker (1860-1921), author
 Josephine Cushman Bateham (1829-1901), reformer, editor, writer
 Lydia Baxter (1809-1874), poet, hymnist
 Lauren Belfer, author
 J. Bowyer Bell (1931–2003), historian, artist and art critic
 Timothy D. Bellavia (born 1971), artist and illustrator
 Emma Lee Benedict (1857-1937), author, editor 
 Louise Blanchard Bethune (1856–1913), architect
 Jennie M. Bingham (1859-1933), author
 Suessa Baldridge Blaine (1860-1932), writer of temperance pageants
 Wolf Blitzer (born 1948), CNN journalist, host of The Situation Room
 Lawrence Block (born 1938), author
 Howard Bloom (born 1943), author
 Sophia Braeunlich (1854-1898), journalist
 Joseph Brodsky (1940–1996), Russian-American poet
 Dale Brown (born 1956), author
 Phoebe Hinsdale Brown (1783-1861), hymnist
 Gordon Bunshaft (1909–1990), architect
 Charles E. Burchfield (1893–1967), artist
 Caroline Chesebro' (1825-1873),writer, publisher
 Charles Clough (born 1951), artist
 Jane Elizabeth Conklin (1831-1914), journalist, writer
 Frances Augusta Conant (1842-1903), journalist, editor
 Anderson Cooper (born 1967), CNN journalist and television personality
 Howard Cosell (1918–1995),  ABC Sports broadcaster from 1953 until 1985
 Bob Costas (born 1952), longtime broadcaster for NBC Sports and television host of 12 Olympic Games
 Burton Crane (1901–1963), journalist
 Robert Creeley (1926–2005), poet
 Jasper Francis Cropsey (1823–1900), artist
 Arthur B. Davies (1863–1928), artist
 Helen Aldrich De Kroyft (1818-1915), author
 Don DeLillo (born 1936), author
 Melvil Dewey (1851–1931), originator of Dewey Decimal System
 Amy Dickinson (born 1959), Chicago Tribune advice columnist
 Anna Bowman Dodd (1858-1929), author
 Amanda Minnie Douglas (1831–1916), writer
 Frederick Douglass (1818–1895), editor and publisher of abolitionist newspapers such as The North Star
 Arthur Dove (1880–1946), artist
 E. J. Eames (1813-1856), writer, poet
 Philip Evergood (1901–1973), artist
 Emma Pike Ewing (1838-1917), educator, author
 Mary Galentine Fenner (1839-1903), poet, litterateur
 Laura Dayton Fessenden (1852-1924), author 
 Leslie Fiedler (1917–2003), literary critic
 Steve Fiorilla (1961–2009), artist
 Ira Joe Fisher (born 1947), author and weatherman; born and raised in Little Valley
 F. Scott Fitzgerald (1896–1940), author; raised in Buffalo
 Edith Willis Linn Forbes (1865-1945), poet, writer
 Helen Frankenthaler (1928–2011), artist
 Kelly Freas (1922–2005), artist
 Anna Katharine Green (1846–1935), author
 E.B. Green (1855–1950), architect
 Julia Boynton Green (1861-1957), poet
 Terry Gross (born 1951), radio host of Fresh Air
 Caren Gussoff, author
 Alex Haley (1921–1992, author of Roots
 Mary C. F. Hall-Wood (1842/3-1899), poet, author
 Sean Hannity (born 1961), radio and television talk show host
 Alfred Harvey (1913–1994), writer and publisher; founder of Harvey Comics
 Richard Hofstadter (1916–1970), author and philosopher
 Paul Horgan (1903–1995), author
 Roni Horn (born 1955), artist
 Elbert Hubbard (1856–1915), philosopher and writer
 Sibyl Marvin Huse (1866-1939), author and teacher
 Idil Ibrahim, director
 Marilla Baker Ingalls (1828-1902), missionary, writer	
 Washington Irving (1783–1859), author of Rip Van Winkle and The Legend of Sleepy Hollow
 Florence Carpenter Ives (1854-1900), journalist
 Henry James (1843–1916), author
 William James (1842–1910), philosopher
 Sally Jenkins (born 1960), sports columnist and feature writer for The Washington Post, and author
 Electa Amanda Wright Johnson (1838-1929), philanthropist, writer	
 James A. Johnson (1865–1939), architect
 Frank Judge, poet and translator
 Michael Kay (born 1961), play-by-play announcer for the New York Yankees
 Ellsworth Kelly (1923–2015), artist
 Megyn Kelly (born 1970), political commentator
 John Kessel (born 1950), author
 Maria Brace Kimball (1852-1933), elocutionist, writer
 Larry King (1933–2021), television and radio host
 Verlyn Klinkenborg (born 1952), member of The New York Times writer and farmer; editorial board
 Nancy Kress (born 1948), author
 Matt Lauer (born 1957), anchor for The Today Show
 Zoe Leonard (born 1961), photographer and visual artist
 Martha D. Lincoln (1838–?), author and journalist
 Robert Longo (born 1953), artist
 Mabel Dodge Luhan (1879–1962), writer and patron
 Bill Maher (born 1956), host of HBO political talk show Real Time with Bill Maher
 Norman Mailer (1923–2007), author
 Francis A. Mallison (1832–1877), journalist and helped organize the Great Civil War Gold Hoax; from Rome
 Helen A. Manville (1839-1912), poet, litterateur
 Brice Marden (born 1938), artist
 Herman Melville (1819–1891), author of Moby-Dick
 Jenny B. Merrill (1854-1934), educator, writer
 Magdalene Merritt (1864-1935), poet 
 Al Michaels (born 1944), longtime sportscaster for both NBC Sports and ABC Sports; play-by-play announcer on Sunday Night Football
 Nettie Leila Michel (1863-1912), magazine editor, writer	
 Marion Juliet Mitchell (1836-1917), poet
 David Muir (born 1973), ABC journalist and anchor
 Ogden Nash (1902–1971), poet
 Minerva Brace Norton (1837-1894), educator, author
 Emily S. Oakey (1829-1883), poet, hymnist
 Joyce Carol Oates (born 1938), author
 Jessie Fremont O'Donnell (1860-1897), writer, lecturer
 Elizabeth M. Olmsted (1825-1910), poet
 Bill O'Reilly (born 1949), host of The O'Reilly Factor on Fox News
 Anna Campbell Palmer (1854-1928), author
 Fanny Purdy Palmer (1839-1923), writer, poet
 Jane Marsh Parker (1836-1913), author, historian, clubwoman
 William Ordway Partridge (1861–1930), sculptor
 Jane Lippitt Patterson (1829-1919), writer, editor
 Margaret B. Peeke (1838-1908), lecturer, author
 Sarah Maria Clinton Perkins (1824-1905), minister, social reformer, editor, author
 Tim Powers (born 1952), author
 Thomas Pynchon (born 1937), author
 Harriet Newell Ralston (1828-1920), poet 	
 Ishmael Reed (born 1938), poet
 John Reed (born 1969), author of Snowball's Chance
 Emma May Alexander Reinertsen (1853-1920), writer 
 Seymour Reit (1918–2001), writer and cartoonist
 Helen Hinsdale Rich (1827-1915), poet
 E. J. Richmond (1825-1918), author
 Norman Rockwell (1894–1978), painter
 Spain Rodriguez (1940–2012), cartoonist
 Milton Rogovin (1909–2011), photographer
 Charles Rohlfs (1853–1936), craftsman
 Al Roker (born 1954), weather anchor for NBC's Today
 Tim Russert (1950–2008), host of NBC's Meet the Press
 Vin Scully (born 1927), longtime broadcaster for the Los Angeles Dodgers
 David Sedaris (born 1956), humorist and author
 Mary Alice Seymour (1837-1897), music critic	
 Emma Augusta Sharkey (1858-1902), journalist, writer
 Al Sharpton (born 1954), civil rights activist and radio talk show host
 Emma L. Shaw (1840-1924), magazine editor
 Grace Carew Sheldon (1855-1921), journalist, writer, editor
 Tony Sisti (1901–1983), painter
 Jeanie Oliver Davidson Smith (1836-1925), poet, romancist
 Lura Eugenie Brown Smith (1854/64-1935), journalist, newspaper editor, writer	
 Harriet Mabel Spalding (1862-1935), poet, litterateur 
 Eugene Speicher (1883–1962), painter
 Amelia M. Starkweather (1840-1926), educator, author
 Esther Baker Steele (1835-1911), educator, author, editor, philanthropist 
 Cynthia Morgan St. John (1852-1919), Wordsworthian, book collector, and author
 Fran Striker (1903–1962), creator of the Lone Ranger and Green Hornet
 Elizabeth Swados (1951–2016), author
 Susie Forrest Swift (1862-1916), editor 
 Jake Tapper (born 1969), news anchor for CNN
 Dorothy Thompson (1983–1961), journalist and radio broadcaster
 Louis Comfort Tiffany (1848–1933), artist
 Mike Tirico (born 1966), sportscaster
 Tom Toles (born 1951), cartoonist
 Sojourner Truth (1797–1883), slave and civil rights activist
 Israel Tsvaygenbaum (born 1961), Russian-American artist
 Mark Twain (1835–1910), author
 Andrew Vachss (1942–2021), author, activist, and lawyer
 Mary Crowell Van Benschoten (1840-1921), author, newspaper publisher/editor
 Emily Elizabeth Veeder (1841-1898), author
 Richard A. Waite (1848–1911), architect
 J. Alden Weir (1852–1919), painter
 Jane Meade Welch (1854-1931), journalist
 Edith Wharton (1862–1937), author
 Walt Whitman (1819–1892), poet
 Brian Williams (born 1959), anchor of NBC Nightly News
 Jeneverah M. Winton (1837-1904), author, poet
 Julia McNair Wright (1840–1903), author
 Marie Robinson Wright (1853-1914), writer
 Julia Ditto Young (1857-1915), novelist, poet
 John Zogby (born 1948), pollster and blogger

Sports

Baseball

 Harrison Bader (born 1994), Major League Baseball outfielder
 Moe Berg (1902–1972), Major League Baseball catcher and spy for the Office of Strategic Services
 Dellin Betances (born 1988), baseball pitcher
 Craig Biggio (born 1965), Baseball Hall of Famer
 Bobby Bonilla (born 1963), baseball player
 Ralph Branca (1926–2016), baseball pitcher
 Ken Brett (1948–2003), baseball pitcher
 Dan Brouthers (1858–1932), Baseball Hall of Famer
 Alexander Cartwright (1820–1892), "father of modern baseball", founding member of the New York Knickerbockers Base Ball Club
 Eddie Collins (1887–1951), Baseball Hall of Famer
 Jimmy Collins (1870–1943), Baseball Hall of Famer
 Bill Dahlen (1870–1950), baseball player
 George Davis (1870–1940), Baseball Hall of Famer
 Harry Eisenstat (1915–2003), baseball player
 Mike Epstein (born 1943), Major League Baseball first baseman
 Johnny Evers (1881–1947), Baseball Hall of Famer
 Whitey Ford (1928–2020), Baseball Hall of Famer
 John Franco (born 1960), baseball pitcher
 Frankie Frisch (1897–1973), Baseball Hall of Famer
 Lou Gehrig (1903–1941), Baseball Hall of Famer
 Sid Gordon (1917–1975), two-time All Star major league baseball player
 Hank Greenberg (1911–1986), Baseball Hall of Famer (Greenwich Village)
 Bucky Harris (1896–1977), baseball manager
 Orel Hershiser (born 1958), baseball player and announcer
 Waite Hoyt (1899–1984), Baseball Hall of Famer
 Joe Kehoskie (born 1973), baseball executive; born in Auburn
 Willie Keeler (1872–1923), Baseball Hall of Famer
 King Kelly (1857–94), Baseball Hall of Famer
 Sandy Koufax (born 1935), Baseball Hall of Famer
 Tim Locastro (born 1992), baseball player; born in Syracuse
 Rob Manfred (born 1958), MLB commissioner; born in Rome
 Jason Marquis (born 1978), Major League Baseball All-Star pitcher
 Edgar Martínez (born 1963), baseball player
 John McGraw (1873–1934), baseball manager; born in Truxton
 Bid McPhee (1859–1943), Baseball Hall of Famer
 Bob Melvin (born 1961), baseball player and manager
 Sam Nahem (1915–2004), Major League Baseball pitcher
 Joe Nathan (born 1974), baseball player, Minnesota Twins; born in Pine Bush
 Jim Palmer (born 1945), Baseball Hall of Famer
 A. J. Pierzynski (born 1976), baseball player (Chicago White Sox); born in Bridgehampton
 Lipman Pike (1845–93), Major League Baseball player; two-time home run champion
 Old Hoss Radbourn (1854–1897), Baseball Hall of Famer
 Phil Rizzuto (1917–2007), Baseball Hall of Famer
 Alex Rodriguez (born 1975), Major League Baseball player
 Saul Rogovin (1923–1995), Major League Baseball pitcher
 Richie Scheinblum (1942–2021), Major League Baseball All Star outfielder
 Norm Sherry (1931–2021), catcher, manager, and coach in Major League Baseball
 Mose Solomon (1900–1966), the "Rabbi of Swat", Major League Baseball player
 Warren Spahn (1921–2003), Baseball Hall of Famer
 Joe Torre (born 1940), baseball player, manager, and executive
 Mickey Welch (1859–1941), Baseball Hall of Famer
 Lou Whitaker (born 1957), baseball player
 Deacon White (1847–1939), Baseball Hall of Famer
 Carl Yastrzemski (born 1939), Baseball Hall of Famer

Basketball

 Kareem Abdul-Jabbar (born 1947), NBA Hall of Fame player
 Carmelo Anthony (born 1984), professional basketball player for the New York Knicks
 Nate Archibald (born 1948), NBA Hall of Fame basketball player
 Red Auerbach (1917–2006), basketball coach
 Desi Barmore (born 1960), basketball player
 David Bernsley (born 1969), American-Israeli basketball player
 Sue Bird (born 1980), Women's National Basketball Association point guard; two-time Olympic champion; four-time All-Star (Seattle Storm) (Syosset)
 Harry Boykoff (1922–2001), professional basketball player for the Boston Celtics
 Larry Brown (born 1940), professional All Star basketball player and coach
 Isaiah Cousins (born 1994), basketball player in the Israeli Basketball Premier League
 Bob Cousy (born 1928), professional basketball player for the Boston Celtics
 Billy Cunningham (born 1943), basketball coach
 Jon Dalzell, basketball player
 John DiBartolomeo (born 1991), basketball player in the Israeli Basketball Premier League
 Billy Donovan (born 1965), basketball coach
 Shay Doron (born 1985), professional basketball player
 Bryant Dunston (born 1986), basketball player
 Julius Erving (born 1950), NBA player
 Mickey Fisher (1904/05–1963) - basketball coach
 Marty Friedman (1889–1986), Hall of Fame pro basketball player and coach
 Marcus Gaither (1961–2020), basketball player
 Jimmy Hall (born 1994), basketball player in the Israeli National League.
 Sidney Hertzberg (1922–2005), professional basketball player
 Art Heyman (1941–2012), professional basketball player
 Nat Holman (1896–1995), Hall of Fame basketball player
 Red Holzman (1920–1998), NBA Hall of Fame basketball player and coach
 Lamont Jones (born 1972), basketball player
 Michael Jordan (born 1963), iconic NBA Hall of Fame basketball player, businessman and owner/chairman of the Charlotte Hornets; considered the best basketball player of all time (Brooklyn)
 Sean Kilpatrick (born 1990), basketball player in NBA and for Hapoel Jerusalem of the Israeli Basketball Super League
 Ken Labanowski (born 1959), basketball player
 Christian Laettner (born 1969), former professional basketball player
 Sylven Landesberg (born 1990), basketball player
 Rudy LaRusso (1927–2004), professional basketball player
 Ivan Leshinsky (born 1947), American-Israeli basketball player
 Nancy Lieberman (born 1958), WNBA Hall of Fame basketball player, general manager, and coach (Olympic silver medal)
 Chris Mullin (born 1963), NBA Hall of Fame basketball player
 Boris Nachamkin (1933–2018), professional basketball player
 Joakim Noah (born 1985), professional basketball player (New York Knicks)
 Lamar Odom (born 1979), former professional basketball player
 Bernard Opper (1915–2000), professional basketball player
 Donna Orender (née Geils) (born 1957), college basketball player and Women's Professional Basketball League All-Star; WNBA president
 Rick Pitino (born 1952), basketball coach
 Tubby Raskin (1902–1981), basketball player and coach
 Pat Riley (born 1945), basketball player, coach, and executive; born in Rome
 Danny Schayes (born 1959), college and professional basketball player; son of Dolph Schayes
 Dolph Schayes (1928–2015), NBA Hall of Fame player and coach
 Ossie Schectman (1919–2013), basketball player; scored the first basket in NBA history
 Barney Sedran (1891–1964), NBA Hall of Fame basketball player
 Adam Silver (born 1962), NBA commissioner
 Lou Silver, basketball player
Russ Smith, former NBA player, currently plays in the Israeli Basketball Premier League
 Sid Tannenbaum (1925–1986), professional basketball player
 Mark Turenshine (1944–2016), basketball player
 Jim Valvano (1946–1993), basketball coach
 Kemba Walker (born 1990), professional basketball player for the Charlotte Hornets
 Metta World Peace (born 1979), former professional basketball player
 Max Zaslofsky (1925–1985), professional basketball player
 Adam Kemp, (born 1990), professional basketball player

Boxing

 Abe "The Little Hebrew" Attell (1883–1970), boxer, World Featherweight Champion
 Riddick "Big Daddy" Bowe (born 1967), World Heavyweight Champion
 Shannon Briggs (born 1971), boxer, World Heavyweight Champion
 Al "Bummy" Davis (1920–45), professional boxer (Brooklyn)
 Abe Goldstein (1898–1977), boxer, World Bantamweight champion
 Zab Judah (born 1977), boxer, World Welterweight and Junior Welterweight Champion Leiner; 1896–1947), boxer, World Lightweight Champion
 Solly Krieger (1909–1964), boxer, World Middleweight Champion
 Jake "Raging [Bronx] Bull" LaMotta (1922–2017), boxer, World Middleweight Champion
 Boyd Melson (born 1981), boxer, World Military Boxing Champions in the 69 kg. weight class
 Samuel Mosberg (1896–1967), boxer, Olympic light heavyweight champion
 Floyd Patterson (1935–2006), boxer, World Heavyweight Champion
 Sugar Ray Robinson (1921–1989), boxer, World Middleweight Champion
 Maxie "Slapsie Maxie" Rosenbloom (1907–1976), World Light Heavyweight Champion
 Charlie Phil Rosenberg (1902–1976), boxer, World Bantamweight Champion
 Barney Ross (born Dov-Ber "Beryl" David Rosofsky; 1909–1967), boxer, world champion in three weight divisions: lightweight, light welterweight, and welterweight
 Isadore "Corporal Izzy" Schwartz (1902–1988), boxer, World Flyweight Champion
 Al "The Bronx Beauty" Singer (1909–1961), boxer, World Lightweight Champion
 Gene Tunney (1897–1978), boxer, World Heavyweight Champion
 Mike Tyson (born 1966), former professional boxer, World Heavyweight Champion

Fencing

 Norman C. Armitage (born Norman Cudworth Cohn; 1907–1972), Olympic medalist saber fencer, 6x Olympian
 Albert Axelrod (1921–2004), Olympic medalist foil fencer, 5x Olympian
 Cliff Bayer (born 1977), 2x Olympic foil fencer
 Robert Blum (born 1928), 2x Olympic saber fencer
 Daniel Bukantz (1917–2008), 4x Olympic foil fencer
 Herbert Cohen (born 1940), 2x Olympic foil fencer
 Gene Glazer (born 1939), 2x Olympic foil fencer
 Hal Goldsmith (born Hans Goldschmidt; 1930–2004), 3x Olympic foil fencer
 Ralph Goldstein (1913–1997), 2x Olympic épée fencer
 Julia Jones-Pugliese (1909–1993), national champion fencer and fencing coach
 Allan Kwartler (1917–1998), 3x Olympic sabre and foil fencer, Pan American Games and Maccabiah Games champion
 Nate Lubell (1916–2006), 3x Olympic foil fencer
 Tim Morehouse (born 1978), Olympic medalist saber fencer, 3x Olympian
 Soren Thompson (born 1981), 2x Olympian, NCAA épée champion, world team champion

American football

 Doc Alexander (1897–1975), football player and coach
 Lyle Alzado (1949–1992), football All Pro player (Denver Broncos, Los Angeles Raiders)
 Russ Brandon (born 1967), football executive
 Jim Brown (born 1936), Hall of Fame football player (Cleveland Browns)
 Tom Coughlin (born 1946), football coach
 Jordan Dangerfield (born 1990), NFL football player
 Boomer Esiason (born 1961), former football player (Cincinnati Bengals)
 D'Brickashaw Ferguson (born 1983), NFL offensive tackle (New York Jets)
 Jay Fiedler (born 1971), NFL football quarterback
 Brian Flores (born 1981), football coach
 Roger Goodell (born 1959), NFL commissioner; born in Jamestown
 Rob Gronkowski (born 1989), former football player (New England Patriots)
 Thomas Hennessy (born 1994), football player
 Arthur Jones (born 1986), football player
 Chandler Jones (born 1990), NFL outside linebacker
 Brett Kern (born 1986), NFL punter (Tennessee Titans)
 Vince Lombardi (1913–1970), football coach
 Sid Luckman (1916–1998), football player (Chicago Bears), inducted into Hall of Fame in 1965
 John Mackey (1941–2011), football player (Baltimore Colts), inducted into Hall of Fame in 1992
 Ali Marpet (born 1993), football player (Tampa Bay Buccaneers)
 Doug Marrone (born 1964), football coach
 Josh Miller (born 1970), football player and football analyst
 Art Monk (born 1957), former football player (Washington Redskins), inducted into Hall of Fame in 2008
 Ed Newman (born 1951), All-Pro football player
 Joe Paterno (1926–2012), football coach
 Matt Patricia (born 1974), football coach
 Adam Podlesh (born 1983), football player
 Ray Rice (born 1987), former football player (Baltimore Ravens)
 Herb Rich (1928–2008), 2x All-Pro football player
Aaron "Rosy" Rosenberg (1912–1979), 2x All-American college football player, and film and television producer 
 Allie Sherman (1923–2015), National Football League player and head coach
 Will Smith (1981–2016), football player (New Orleans Saints) (born in Queens)
 Alan Veingrad (born 1963), NFL football player
 Pop Warner (1871–1954), football coach

Ice hockey

 Gary Bettman (born 1952), NHL commissioner
 Ryan Callahan (born 1985), NHL ice hockey player (Tampa Bay Lightning) (Rochester)
 Tim Erixon (born 1991), American-born Swedish ice hockey player (Port Chester)
 Joel Farabee (born 2000), NHL ice hockey player (Philadelphia Flyers) (Cicero)
Adam Fox (born 1998), NHL ice hockey defenseman (New York Rangers)
 Brian Gionta (born 1979), NHL ice hockey player (Buffalo Sabres) (Rochester)
 Patrick Kane (born 1988), NHL ice hockey player (Chicago Blackhawks) (Buffalo)
 Seymour H. Knox III (1926–1996), co-founder of the Buffalo Sabres
 Alex "Mine Boy" Levinsky (1910–1990), American-born Canadian NHL player (Syracuse)
 Eric Nystrom (born 1983), NHL player
 Max Pacioretty (born 1988), NHL ice hockey player (Vegas Golden Knights)
 Mathieu Schneider (born 1969), NHL player

Soccer
Jordan Cila (born 1982), Major League Soccer midfielder 
 Benny Feilhaber (born 1985), soccer midfielder
 Shep Messing (born 1949), Olympic soccer goalkeeper and current broadcaster
 Charlie Reiter (born 1988), soccer player
 Sara Whalen (born 1976), Olympic soccer player

Tennis

 Marilyn Aschner (born 1948), tennis player
 Irvin Dorfman (1924–2006), tennis player
 Herbert Flam (1928–1980), tennis player
 Jim Grabb (born 1964), tennis player
 Jim Gurfein (born 1961), tennis player
 Ladislav Hecht (1909–2004), tennis player
 Scott Lipsky (born 1981), tennis player
 Jamie Loeb (born 1995), tennis player
 Bruce Manson (born 1956), tennis player
 John McEnroe (born 1959), tennis player
 Renée Richards (born 1934), tennis player
 Noah Rubin (born 1996), tennis player
 Ed Rubinoff (born 1935), tennis player
 Julius Seligson (1909–1987), tennis player
 Bill Tilden (1893–1953), tennis player

Track and field

 Andy Bloom (born 1973), Olympic shot putter
Lillian Copeland (1904–1964), Olympic discus champion; set world records in discus, javelin, and shot put
 Caitlyn Jenner (formerly Bruce Jenner) (born 1949), retired decathlete, gold medalist at the 1976 Montreal Olympics, and television personality
 Judy Shapiro-Ikenberry (born 1942), long-distance runner

Other sports

 Carl Adams (born 1950), two-time NCAA wrestling champion, coach, and businessman
 Ed Banach (born 1960), Olympic gold medalist in freestyle wrestling
 Lou Banach (born 1960), Olympic gold medalist in freestyle wrestling
 Herman Barron (1909–1978), professional golfer
 Jeff Blatnick (1957–2012), Olympic gold medalist in Greco-Roman wrestling
 Glenn Cowan (1952–2004), table tennis player
 Kyle Dake (born 1991), Olympic freestyle wrestler, three-time World Champion, and four-time NCAA wrestling champion in four different weight classes
 Tommy Dreamer (born 1971), professional wrestler (Yonkers)
Jim Drucker (born 1952/1953), former Commissioner of the Continental Basketball Association, former Commissioner of the Arena Football League, and founder of NewKadia Comics
 Mick Foley (born 1965), professional wrestler and author
 Danielle Goldstein (born 1985), American-Israeli show jumper
 Carol Heiss (born 1940), figure skater, 1960 Olympic champion, five-time World Champion
 Laurie Hernandez (born 2000), artistic gymnast, gold medalist at the 2016 Rio Olympics, and winner of Dancing with the Stars season 23
 Kevin Jackson (born 1964), Olympic gold medalist and two-time world champion in freestyle wrestling
 Jon Jones (born 1987), UFC Light heavyweight champion
 Ryan Lochte (born 1984), competitive swimmer, gold medalist at the 2004, 2008, 2012, and 2016 Olympics, and contestant on Dancing with the Stars season 23 (Rochester)
 Lia Neal (born 1995), competitive swimmer, silver and bronze Olympic medalist (Brooklyn)
 Colette Nelson (born 1974), professional bodybuilder
 Beth Phoenix (born 1980), professional wrestler (born in Elmira, New York)
 Aljamain Sterling (born 1989), UFC Champion
 Ashley Twichell (born 1989), Olympic swimmer (Fayetteville)
 Chris Weidman (born 1984), former UFC Middleweight Champion

Business

 John Jacob Astor, fur trader and company founder
 Nicholas F. Brady, former CEO of Dillon Read and 68th United States Secretary of the Treasury
 Helen Gilman Noyes Brown, philanthropist, clubwoman
 C. Douglas Dillon, former CEO of Dillon Read, United States Ambassador to France (1953–1957), and 57th United States Secretary of the Treasury
 George Eastman (1854–1932), founder of Eastman Kodak
 Joseph Ellicott (1760–1826), surveyor and city planner
 William Fargo (1818–1881), co-founder of American Express Company and Wells Fargo; Mayor of Buffalo
 Reggie Fils-Aimé (born 1961), president and chief operating officer of Nintendo of America
 Debra Fox, founder of Fox Learning Systems
 Alexander Snow Gordon (died 1803), silversmith 
 Scott Greenstein (born 1959), president and chief content officer of Sirius XM Satellite Radio
 E. H. Harriman, errand boy, broker, railroader
 George A. Hormel (1860–1946), founder of Hormel
 Jeremy Jacobs (born 1940), owner of Delaware North and Boston Bruins
 John J. Kennedy (1857–1914), financier and 45th New York State Treasurer
 Harriette A. Keyser (1841-1936), industrial reformer
 Seymour H. Knox I (1861–1915), businessman and co-founder of F. W. Woolworth Company
 Seymour H. Knox II (1898–1990), philanthropist and former director of Marine Midland Bank
 Reginald Lenna, CEO and philanthropist
 Jon L. Luther, food service executive
 Sherman J. Maisel (1918–2010), economist
 Jeremiah Milbank, banker, co-founder of Borden Milk Co. (1857)
 Jacquelyn Ottman, marketing consultant
 Henry Paulson, former CEO of Goldman Sachs and United States Secretary of the Treasury
Nelson Peltz (born 1942), billionaire businessman and investor
 Joseph R. Perella, financier
 Jeffry Picower (1942–2009), investor and noted philanthropist involved in the Madoff investment scandal
 Pat Powers (1870–1948), movie producer
 Donald Regan, former CEO of Merrill Lynch and 66th United States Secretary of the Treasury
 Robert E. Rich Sr. (1913–2006), inventor and foodservice executive
 David Rockefeller (1915–2017), banker
 John D. Rockefeller (1839–1937), philanthropist and founder of Standard Oil
 John D. Rockefeller Jr., philanthropist and financier
 William Rockefeller (1841–1941), co-founder of Standard Oil
Jeffrey Rosen, billionaire businessman
 Robert Rubin, former CEO of Goldman Sachs and 70th United States Secretary of the Treasury
 Scott Rudin, movie producer
 Jacob Schiff, Wall Street executive and banker
 Edward Selzer (1893–1970), movie producer
 Ellsworth Milton Statler (1863–1928), hotelier
 Stuart Sternberg (born 1959), owner of the Tampa Bay Rays
 Jill Stuart, fashion designer
 Donald Trump Jr. (born 1977), businessman; eldest son of Donald Trump and brother of Eric, Ivanka, and Tiffany
 Eric Trump (born 1984), philanthropist and businessman; son of Donald Trump and brother of Ivanka, Tiffany, and Donald Jr.
 Ivanka Trump (born 1981), businesswoman, writer, and former fashion model; daughter of Donald Trump and sister of Eric, Donald Jr., and Tiffany
 Tiffany Trump (born 1993), daughter of Donald Trump and sister of Ivanka, Eric, and Donald Jr.
 Cornelius Vanderbilt, ferry and tugboat captain, company founder, and railroader
 Sanford Weill, former CEO of Citigroup
 Henry Wells (1805–1878), businessman
 Bob Weinstein, movie producer and co-founder of Miramax Films
 Harvey Weinstein, movie producer and co-founder of Miramax Films
 John G. Wickser (1858–1928), businessman and New York State Treasurer (1903–1904)
 Robert G. Wilmers (1934–2017), CEO of M&T Bank
 Christopher Woodrow, movie producer
 Mark Zuckerberg (born 1984), founder and CEO of Facebook

Fashion, beauty, and modeling

 Keith Carlos (born 1987), fashion model, former football player, and winner of America's Next Top Model season 21
 Nyle DiMarco (born 1989), model, actor, deaf activist, and winner of Dancing with the Stars season 22 and America's Next Top Model season 22
 Tom Ford (born 1961), fashion designer, film director, screenwriter, and film producer
 Mary Therese Friel (born 1960), beauty queen, model, businesswoman, and winner of Miss USA 1979
 Marc Jacobs (born 1963), fashion designer and former creative director of Louis Vuitton (1997–2014)
 Scarlett Johansson (born 1984), actress, model, and singer
 Calvin Klein (born 1942), fashion designer and founder of Calvin Klein Inc
 Michael Kors (born 1959), sportswear fashion designer; founder and CEO of Michael Kors Holdings
 Ralph Lauren (born 1939), fashion designer, philanthropist, business executive, and founder of the Ralph Lauren Corporation
 Stacy London (born 1969), stylist, fashion consultant
 Jackie Loughery (born 1930), actress, beauty queen, and inaugural winner of Miss USA
 Sienna Miller (born 1981), actress, model, and fashion designer
 Sarah Natochenny (born 1987), actress, film editor, fashion model, and voice actress
 Rachel Nichols (born 1980), actress and model
 Hayden Panettiere (born 1989), actress, model, singer, and activist
 Kimberly Pressler (born 1977), model, reality television star, and first runner-up at Miss USA 1995
 Tanya Roberts (1955–2020), actress, model
 Carmen Marc Valvo (born 1953), evening-wear and high-end cocktail dress designer

Lawyers and jurists

 Nicholas Allard (born 1952), Dean and President of Brooklyn Law School
 Benjamin N. Cardozo (1870–1938), Associate Justice of the Supreme Court of the United States
 Alan Dershowitz (born 1938), Harvard Law School professor and scholar of United States constitutional law and criminal law
 Linda Fairstein (born 1947), prosecutor and author
 Gerrit Forbes (1836–1906), Justice of the Supreme Court of New York
 Felix Frankfurter (1882–1965), Associate Justice of the Supreme Court of the United States
 Henry Friendly (1903–1986), judge on the United States Court of Appeals for the Second Circuit
 Kumiki Gibson, lawyer
 Ruth Bader Ginsburg (1933–2020), Associate Justice of the Supreme Court of the United States
 Arthur Goldberg (1908–1990), United States Secretary of Labor, Associate Justice of the Supreme Court of the United States, and United States Ambassador to the United Nations
 Edith Julia Griswold (1863-1926), in her day, she was the only woman patent expert
 Alvin Hellerstein (born 1933), United States federal judge
 John Jay (1745–1829), first Chief Justice of the United States
 Elena Kagan (born 1960), Associate Justice of the Supreme Court of the United States
 A. Leo Levin (1919–2015), law professor at the University of Pennsylvania Law School
 John Roberts (born 1955), Chief Justice of the United States
 Antonin Scalia (1936–2016), Associate Justice of the Supreme Court of the United States
 Sonia Sotomayor (born 1954), Associate Justice of the Supreme Court of the United States
 Amy Wax (born 1953), Robert Mundheim Professor of Law at the University of Pennsylvania Law School

Religious leaders
 Marilla Baker Ingalls (1828-1902), missionary to Burma for 51 years
 Avraham Qanaï, leader of one of the first Karaite Jewish congregations in the United States
 Emanuel Rackman (1910–2008), Modern Orthodox rabbi; President of Bar-Ilan University
 Menachem Mendel Schneerson (1902–1994), Orthodox Jewish rabbi

Science and medicine

 Richard Axel (born 1946), scientist and Nobel Prize winner
 Cora Belle Brewster (1859-1937), physician, surgeon, medical writer, editor
 Flora A. Brewster (1852-1919), physician, surgeon, editor
 Anna Manning Comfort (1845-1931), physician
 Mary Gage Day (1857-1935), physician, medical writer
 Gertrude B. Elion (1918–1999), biochemist, pharmacologist and Nobel Prize winner
 Richard P. Feynman (1918–1988), physicist and Nobel prize winner
 Murray Gerstenhaber (born 1927), mathematician and lawyer
 Carl Sagan (1934–1996), astronomer
 Jonas Salk (1914–1995), scientist and developed first polio vaccine
 George Herman Babcock (1832–1893), inventor 
 William Martin Beauchamp, ethnologist and clergyman. Born in Orange County, he served an Episcopal parish in Baldwinsville for 35 years while also performing archæological research, particularly concerning the Haudenosaunee, and publishing his findings in eight books between 1892 and 1908.
 Dr. Elizabeth Blackwell, abolitionist, women's rights activist, and the first female doctor in the United States, studied medicine at Geneva College.
 Willis Carrier, inventor
 Cornelius Cooper, African-American physician, famous for his lawsuit to separate from the U.S. Army as an objector to the war while attending West Point Military Academy
 Dr. Asa Fitch of Salem, first occupational entomologist in the United States.  In 1838 he began to collect and study insects for New York state. In 1854 he became the first professional Entomologist of New York State Agricultural Society, commissioned by the State of New York.
 Dr. George Franklin Grant. Born in Oswego, he was the first African-American professor at Harvard. He was also a Boston dentist, and the inventor of the golf tee.
 James Hall (paleontologist)
 Professor Joseph Henry, scientist who advanced the understanding of electricity, and who served as the first Secretary of the Smithsonian Institution.
 Franklin B. Hough
 Irving Langmuir, chemist and physicist, Nobel laureate and resident of Schenectady.
 Eben Jenks Loomis, born at Oppenheim, was an astronomer. He was assistant in the Harvard American Ephemeris and Nautical Almanac office from 1850 until his retirement in 1900. During this time he also held the position of special assistant at the United States Naval Observatory in Washington, DC.  He was a member of the United States eclipse expedition to Africa of 1889.
 Lewis Henry Morgan of Aurora and Rochester, ethnologist, anthropologist, writer and attorney. Karl Marx and Friedrich Engels relied on his accounts of the evolution of indigenous peoples to fill in their own account of the development of capitalist society.
 Roger Tory Peterson, naturalist, ornithologist, writer and educator, born in Jamestown.
 Henry Rowe Schoolcraft, geographer, geologist, and ethnologist, born in Guilderland.
 Dr. Edward Livingston Trudeau, established the Adirondack Cottage Sanitarium at Saranac Lake for treatment of tuberculosis.
 Charles Doolittle Walcott, paleontologist
 Dr. Mary Edwards Walker of Oswego, feminist, abolitionist, prohibitionist, suffragist, alleged spy, prisoner of war, surgeon, and the only woman to receive the Medal of Honor.
 Henry Augustus Ward

Foreign-born New Yorkers

 Moses Michael Levi Barrow (born Jamal Michael Barrow; 1978), better known by his stage name Shyne, Belizean rapper and politician
 Andrulla Blanchette (born 1966), British-born professional bodybuilder
 Maksim Chmerkovskiy (born 1980), Ukrainian-born Latin ballroom dancer, choreographer, and instructor from ABC's Dancing with the Stars; brother of Val
 Valentin Chmerkovskiy (born 1986), Ukrainian-born professional dancer from ABC's Dancing with the Stars; brother of Maks
 Laura Creavalle (born 1959), Guyanese-born Canadian/American professional bodybuilder
 Lisa Cross (born 1978), British-born professional bodybuilder
 Steven Derounian (1918–2007), Bulgarian-born politician and former United States Representative of New York (1953–1963, 1963–65)
 Heather Foster (born 1966), Jamaican-born American professional bodybuilder
 Bev Francis (born 1955), Australian-born professional bodybuilder, powerlifter, and national shot put champion
 Carolina Herrera (born 1939), Venezuelan-born fashion designer; dress designer of First Ladies from Jacqueline Kennedy Onassis to Michelle Obama
 Kyrie Irving (born 1992), Australian-born American professional basketball player for the Brooklyn Nets (formerly for the Cleveland Cavaliers)
 John Kneller (1916–2009), English-American professor and fifth President of Brooklyn College
 John Leguizamo (born 1964), Colombian-born actor, voice actor, producer, and stand-up comedian
 Sean Patrick Maloney (born 1966), Canadian-born politician and U.S. Representative of New York since 2013
 Joel McHale (born 1971), Italian-born actor, comedian, writer, television producer, and television host
 Nicki Minaj (born 1982), Trinidadian-born rapper and singer
 Edward Mosberg (1926-2022), Polish-American Holocaust survivor, educator, and philanthropist
 Pelé (real name Edson Arantes do Nascimento) (born 1940), Brazilian-born iconic soccer player and honorary president of the New York Cosmos; considered the best soccer player of all time
 Keanu Reeves (born 1964), Lebanese-born Canadian/American actor, producer, and musician
 Alana Shipp (born 1982), Barbadian-born Israeli/American professional bodybuilder
 Gene Simmons (real name Chaim Weitz) (born 1949), Israeli-born musician, singer-songwriter, record producer, entrepreneur, actor, television personality, and lead singer of the band Kiss
 Albio Sires (born 1951), Cuban-born politician and United States Representative of New Jersey since 2006
 Snooki (real name Nicole Polizzi) (born 1987), Chilean-born reality television personality from Jersey Shore
 Amelie Veiller Van Norman (1844–1920), French-born American educator and civic reformer
 Bruce Willis (born 1955), German-born American actor, producer, and singer
 Jason Wu (born 1982), Taiwanese-born Canadian/American fashion designer and designer of First Lady Michelle Obama's dresses

Infamous New Yorkers

 David Berkowitz (born 1953), serial killer (also known as "Son of Sam" and ".44 Caliber Killer")
 Billy the Kid (1859–1881), notorious wild west criminal
 Al Capone (1899–1947), gangster; co-founder and boss of the Chicago Outfit
 Frank Costello (1891–1973), Italian-American Mafia gangster
 Robert Garrow (1936–1978), spree killer
 David Hampton (1964–2003), actor and impostor; posed as Poitier's son "David" in 1983, which inspired a play and film
 Steven Hoffenberg, CEO and fraudster
 Lucky Luciano (1897–1962), mobster; considered the father of modern organized crime in the United States 
 Eugene Palmer (born 1939), murderer and fugitive
 Theodore Rinaldo (1944–2000), convicted child sex offender
 Shirley Winters (born 1948), convicted arsonist and accused serial killer
Joseph James DeAngelo (born 1945) serial killer (also known as the "Golden State Killer")

Other

 Mary Jane Aldrich (1833-1909), social reformer
 Elnora Monroe Babcock (1852-1934), suffragist
 Helen Morton Barker (1834-1910), social reformer
 Emily Montague Mulkin Bishop (1858-1916), suffragist, writer 
 Lina Beecher (1841–1915), roller coaster designer and inventor
 Margaret McDonald Bottome (1827-1906), reformer, author
 William Boylan (1869–1940), first President of Brooklyn College
 Grace Brown (1886–1906), murder victim
 Lucinda Banister Chandler (1828-1911), social reformer
 Cordelia Throop Cole (1833-1900), social reformer, writer, editor	
 Emily Parmely Collins (1814-1909), suffragist, activist, writer
 Julia Colman (1828-1909), social reformer
 Daniel Daly (1873–1937), United States Marine, received Medal of Honor twice
 Frances Elizabeth Fryatt, specialist in household applied arts 
 Mary Ninde Gamewell (1858-1947), missionary, author
 Harry Gideonse (1901–1985), President of Brooklyn College, and Chancellor of The New School for Social Research
 Harriet Newell Kneeland Goff (1828-1901), reformer, author
 Wilson Greatbatch (1919–2011), inventor
 Katherine Van Allen Grinnell (1839-1917), social reformer, author 
 Annabel Morris Holvey (1855-1910), social reformer, writer
 Cornelia Collins Hussey (1827-1902), philanthropist, suffragist
 Clarissa Caldwell Lathrop (1847-1892), social reformer
 Jennie Phelps Purvis (1831-1924), suffragist, reformer, writer
 Frances Shimer (1826–1901), founder of Shimer College
 Richard Stallman (born 1953), programmer of Emacs and founder of GNU
 Emily Pitts Stevens (1841-1906), activist, editor
 Katharine Lent Stevenson (1853-1919), reformer, missionary
 Josephine Terranova (1889–1981), criminal defendant
 Mary Evalin Warren (1829-1904), social reformer, author
 Charlotte Fowler Wells (1814-1901), phrenologist
 Mary Traffarn Whitney (1852-1942), minister, reformer, philanthropist
 Margaret E. Winslow (1836-1936), activist, editor, writer

See also

 List of people associated with Albany County, New York

References